The Acari River is a river of Minas Gerais state in southeastern Brazil.

See also
 List of rivers of Minas Gerais

References

 Map from Ministry of Transport
 Rand McNally, The New International Atlas, 1993.

Rivers similar to or like Acari River (Minas Gerais) 

 Pardo River (São Francisco River tributary) River of Minas Gerais state in southeastern Brazil. Tributary of the São Francisco River. Wikipedia
 Paracatu River (Brasília de Minas) River of Minas Gerais state in southeastern Brazil. It joins the São Francisco River just 12 km north of the mouth of its much larger namesake the Paracatu River on the opposite bank. Wikipedia
 Colindó River River of Minas Gerais state in southeastern Brazil. List of rivers of Minas Gerais Wikipedia
 Pacuí River (São Francisco River tributary) River of Minas Gerais state in southeastern Brazil. Tributary of the São Francisco River. Wikipedia
 Indaiá River River of Minas Gerais state in southeastern Brazil. List of rivers of Minas Gerais Wikipedia
 Japoré River River of Minas Gerais state in southeastern Brazil. List of rivers of Minas Gerais Wikipedia

Rivers of Minas Gerais